Kheyrabad (also Romanized as Kheyrābād) is a village in Bala Khaf Rural District, Salami District, Khaf County, Razavi Khorasan Province, Iran. At the 2006 census, its population was 1,094, in 245 families.

References 

Populated places in Khaf County